Rampur is a city, and the municipality headquarter of Rampur District in the Indian state of Uttar Pradesh. It was formerly known for its various industries, like sugar refining and cotton milling. Its library has more than 12,000 rare manuscripts and a fine collection of Mughal miniature paintings. It is located 322 kilometres north-west of the state capital Lucknow.

In 2007, the Ministry of Minority Affairs identified Rampur District as one of 14 'Minority Concentration' districts in the state, on the basis of the 2001 census data on population, socio-economic indicators and basic amenities indicators. The city is known for its Rampuri chaaku (knife).

Etymology 
Originally it was a group of four villages named Kather, the name of Raja Ram Singh. The first Nawab proposed to rename the city Faizabad. But many other places were known by the name Faizabad so its name was changed to Mustafabad alias Rampur.

History 

As per medieval history, Rampur was the part of the Delhi region, and was divided between Badaun and Sambhal districts. Being situated on upperside of Rohilkhand, it was known by the name Kather  and was ruled by Katheria Rajputs. The Katheria Rajputs resisted external for about 400 years, fighting the sultans of Delhi and later with the Mughals. They went to repeated battles with Nasiruddin Mahmud in 1253, Ghiyas ud din Balban in 1256, Jalal-ud-din Khalji in 1290, Firuz Shah Tughlaq in 1379 & Sikandar Lodi in 1494.

Later, in the beginning of the Mughal period, the capital of Rohilkhand was changed from Badaun to Bareilly and hence the importance of Rampur increased.

The Rohilla War of 1774–5 began when the Rohilla Pathans - dominant in the area - reneged on a debt they owed the Nawab of Oudh for military assistance against the Marathas in 1772. The Rohillas were defeated and driven from their former capital of Bareilly by the Nawab with the assistance of the East India Company's troops lent by Warren Hastings.

The Rohilla State of Rampur was established by Nawab Faizullah Khan on 7 October 1774 in the presence of British Commander Colonel Champion, and remained a pliant state under British protection thereafter.

Khan laid the first stone of the new fort at Rampur and thus Rampur city was founded in 1775. Originally it was a group of four villages named Kather, the name of Raja Ram Singh. The first Nawab proposed to rename the city 'Faizabad'. But many other places were known by the name of Faizabad already existed, so the name was changed to Mustafabad alias Rampur. Nawwab Faizullah Khan ruled for 20 years. He was a great patron of scholarship, and began the collection of Arabic, Persian, Turkish and Urdu manuscripts which now make up the bulk of the Rampur Raza Library. After his death his son Muhammad Ali Khan took over, but he was killed by the Rohilla leaders after 24 days, and Ghulam Muhammad Khan, the brother of the deceased, was proclaimed Nawab. The East India Company took exception to this, and after a reign of just 3 months and 22 days Ghulam Muhammad Khan was defeated by its forces.  The Governor-General made Ahmad Ali Khan, son of the late Muhammad Ali Khan, the new Nawab. He ruled for 44 years. He did not have any sons, so Muhammad Sa'id Khan, son of Ghulam Muhammad Khan, took over as the new Nawab. He raised a regular Army, established Courts and carried out many works to improve the economic conditions of farmers. His son Muhammad Yusuf Ali Khan took over after his death. His son Kalb Ali Khan became the new Nawab in 1865.

Nawab Kalb Ali Khan was literate in Arabic and Persian. Under his rule, the state did much work to uplift standards of education. He was also a Member of Council during the Viceroyalty of Lord John Lawrence. He built the Jama Masjid in Rampur at a cost of Rs. 300,000. He was also knighted in Agra by the Prince of Wales. He ruled for 22 years and 7 months. After his death his son Mushtaq Ali Khan took over. He appointed W. C. Wright as the Chief Engineer of the state and built many new buildings and canals. Nawab Hamid Ali became the new ruler in 1889 at the age of 14. Many new schools were opened during his reign, and many donations were provided to nearby colleges. He donated Rs. 50,000 to Lucknow Medical College. In 1905 he built the magnificent Darbar Hall within the Fort which now houses the great collection of Oriental manuscripts held by the Rampur Raza Library. His son Raza Ali Khan became the last ruling Nawab in 1930.

On 1 July 1949 the State of Rampur was merged into the Republic of India. Rampur today presents a slightly decayed appearance: the palaces of the Nawabs are crumbling, as are the gates and walls of the fort. However, the Library remains a flourishing institution of immense value to scholars from all over the world.

The Nawabs of Rampur sided with the British during Indian Rebellion of 1857, and this enabled them to continue to play a role in the social, political and cultural life of Northern India in general and the Muslims of the United Provinces in particular. They gave refuge to some of the literary figures from the Court of Bahadur Shah Zafar.

Post-independence
Descendants of the Nawabs include Murad Mian the first child of Murtaza Ali Khan of Rampur. Begum Noor Bano, the widow of the former Nawab's younger brother and ex-MP Zulfiquar Ali Khan of Rampur. Begum Noor Bano has become a politician and won the election from Rampur parliamentary constituency in 1999. She lost the elections in 2004,2009 from Rampur and 2014 from Moradabad consecutively. Murtaza Ali Khan and Zulfiquar Ali Khan (aka Mikki Mia), who continued to use the title of Nawab as a token even after independence and abolition of royalty but never ruled Rampur, are now dead. Murtaza Ali contested an election from Rampur opposite his mother Rafat Jamani Begum in 1972 and won. Although the two brothers were always political rivals they never faced each other in elections. Subsequently, the family was also involved in smuggling scandals involving some smuggling from Pakistan, where one of the sons of Murtaza Ali is married. Raza Inter College, Hamid Inter College and Murtaza Inter College are three higher secondary schools named after three nawabs.

The present Nawab of Rampur, Muhammad Murad Ali Khan Bahadur is the present titular Nawab of Rampur. The eldest son of Murtuza Ali Khan Bahadur, he succeeded his father as titular Nawab upon the latter's death in 1982. He served as a member on the Raza Library Board in Rampur from 1993 to 2002.

Geography 
Rampur, located between longitude 79°05' E and latitude 28°48' N, is in Moradabad Division of Uttar Pradesh, India. It is surrounded by district Udham Singh Nagar in north, Bareilly in east, and Moradabad in west and Badaun in south. Spread in area of 2,367 km2, Rampur is 192-meter above sea level in north and 166.4-meter in south. It is home to farms that cover long stretches of land. During the monsoon just after a long period of rain the mountain ranges of Nainital can be seen in the north direction.

Climate 
During Summers the temperature is usually from 31 °C to 30 °C and during Winters it is from 25 °C to 5 °C.

Demographics 

As per the 2011 Census of India, Rampur had a population of 325,248 (compared to 281,549 in 2001) showing 16% growth in 2001–11. Males constituted 52.2% and females 47.8% of the population. Sex ratio was 915 compared to the national average of 940. Rampur had an average literacy rate of 53.7%, much lower than the national average of 64.3%. Male literacy was 56%, and female literacy was 51%. In Rampur, children under six years of age numbered 37,945 and were 11.7% of the population (14% in 2001).

The city has a majority Muslim population. The greater region around Rampur still has a significant number of Rohilla.

Culture and Urdu Poetry 

Rampur is considered as third school of poetry after Delhi and Lucknow.  Many prominent and legendary Urdu poets of the time like Daagh Dehlvi, Mirza Ghalib and Amir Meenai joined the patronage of Rampur court. Nawabs of Rampur were very fond of poetry and other fine arts. They provided remunerations to the poets who were associated with ' darbar.' Nizam Rampuri earned great name as poet. In addition, Shad Aarifi was another poet from Rampur who evolved modern ghazal in a very distinct style.

Architecture 

The Rulers of Rampur have had distinct impact on the architecture of the region. The buildings and monuments signify the presence of Mughal type architecture. Some of the buildings are very old and have been built over repeatedly in course of time.

One of the most well designed monument is the Fort of Rampur (Hindi:रामपुर का किला). It also houses the Raza Library or Hamid Manzil, the former palace of the Rulers. It has a sizeable collection of Oriental manuscripts in Asia. The fort also houses the Imambara.

The Jama Masjid is one of the finest piece of architecture to be found in Rampur. It resembles the jama masjid in Delhi to some extent. It was built by Nawab Faizullah Khan. It has a unique mughal touch to it. There are several entry-exit gates to the masjid. It has three big domes and four tall minarets with gold pinnacles boasting of a royal touch. It has a main lofty entrance gate that has an inbuilt clock tower occupied by a big clock that was imported from Britain.

There are several entry-exit gates built by the Nawab. These gates are major entry-exit routes from the city. Examples are Shahbad Gate, Nawab Gate, Bilaspur Gate etc.

Music 
The Rampur-Sahaswan gharana of Hindustani classical music also has its origins in court musicians. Ustad Mehboob Khan, was a khayal singer and Veena player of the Rampur court; his son Ustad Inayat Hussain Khan (1849–1919), who trained and lived in the city, founded the gharana.

Cuisine 
Rampuri cuisine, a part of the Mughal cuisine tradition, developed by the chefs of the Nawabs, is also known for its distinct flavours and dishes with recipes passed on from the royal kitchen, like Rampuri fish,  Chicken Changezi ,  Pasande haleem , Rampuri Korma, Rampuri mutton kebabs,  doodhiya biryani,  Dogoshta biryani and  adrak ka halwa,  Sohan halwa .

Knife making 
 
Rampur was traditionally famous for the knives known as Rampuri Chaaku, which even made their way to Bollywood crime thrillers in the 1960s and 1970s. Eventually the Government of Uttar Pradesh banned making knives longer than 4.5 inches in blade length, leading to a drop in their popularity.

Rampur Greyhound 
The Rampur Greyhound is a smooth-haired sighthound native to the region, often described as being more substantially built than other greyhounds. It was the favoured hound of the Nawabs for jackal coursing, but was also used to hunt lions, tigers, leopards, and panthers. Mh Nawab Ahmad Ali Khan Bahadur bred these dogs by combining Tazi and English Greyhound bloodlines.

Festivals 
Religious practices are as much an integral part of everyday life and a very public affair as they are in the rest of India. Therefore, not surprisingly, many festivals are religious in origin although several of them are celebrated irrespective of caste and creed. Among the most important Hindu festivals are Diwali, Holi and Vijayadashami, Mahashivaratri, Ram Navmi, Basant Panchami, Sri Krishna Janamastmi and Raksha Bandhan, which are also observed by Jains and Sikhs. Eid ul Milad, Eid ul-Fitr, Bakr-Id, Muharram are Muslim religious festivals. Mahavir Jayanti is celebrated by Jains, Buddha Jayanti by Buddhists, Guru Nanak Jayanti by Sikhs and Good Friday, Christmas by the Christians.

Transport

Rail

Rampur Railway Station (station code RMU) lies on the Lucknow-Moradabad line and junction point of Kathgodam railway line. which work under NER. Train connections include Avadh Assam Express, Jammu Tawi-Sealdah Express, Kashi Vishwanath Express, Howrah-Amritsar Express, Ganga Sutlej Express and Satyagraha Express. Seat reservation is computerised. The station is served by the Northern Railways. Moradabad railway station is 30 km to the west of Rampur. Going south-east, Bareilly railway station is the nearest major station. Hotel Tourist and Restaurant is only 5-minute walk from the railway station. The electrification of railway lines of Rampur junction is completed.

Various express trains come here. The important ones are Delhi-Kathgodam Shatabdi, Delhi-Bareilly Inter-city Express, Lucknow-Delhi Lucknow Mail, Delhi-Kathgodam Ranikhet Express, Bareilly-Bhuj Ala Hazrat Express, Amritsar-Howrah Amritsar Mail.

Road

National Highway 9 passes through Rampur. Regular buses connect Rampur to Moradabad every ½ hr. Direct buses are also available from Delhi, Lucknow, Bareilly, Aligarh Haridwar, Rishikesh, Kanpur, Rupaidhiya, Agra etc. National Highway 530 originates at Rampur.

Air
Bareilly Airport is a nearest major domestic airport to Rampur which is located around 69 km from Rampur,it is connected to cities like Mumbai, New Delhi and Bangalore with direct flights.

Moradabad Airport is an upcoming airport between Moradabad and Rampur, being upgraded from an existing government airstrip.

Places of interest 

Jama Masjid

The foundation of Jama Masjid in Rampur was laid by Nawab Faizullah Khan. It was built at the cost of 300,000 at that time and it was further completed by Nawab Kalb Ali Khan.
The area around the Jama Masjid became a center of attraction and a big market was developed around it, known today as the Shadab Market. A big jewellery market also lines the masjid known as Sarrafa. The shops were rented out to businessmen to meet the mosque's requirements. Hindus and Muslims both own these shops and customers belong to both communities. This shows communal harmony that exists in this area.

Raza Library 

Nawab Faizullah Khan, who ruled Rampur from 1774 to 1794, established the library from his personal collection of ancient manuscripts and miniature specimens of Islamic calligraphy in the last decades of the 18th century. It is one of the biggest libraries of Asia. As all the succeeding Nawabs were great patrons of scholars, poets, painters, calligraphers and musicians, the library grew by leaps and bounds. Notable additions were made to the collection during the rule of Nawab Ahmad Ali Khan (1794–1840).

It contains very rare and valuable collection of manuscripts, historical documents, specimens of Islamic calligraphy, miniature paintings, astronomical instruments and rare illustrated works in Arabic and Persian. The Raza Library also contains printed works in Sanskrit, Hindi, Urdu, Pashto (having the original manuscript of the first translation of the Qur'an in addition to other important books/documents), Tamil and Turkish, and approximately 30,000 printed books (including periodicals) in various other languages.

Rampur Planetarium

State of the art planetarium is being established at Rampur. This will be India's first planetarium based on Digital Laser technology. The planetarium building is almost complete and equipments are being installed. The information will be directly fed by NASA.

Gandhi Samadhi

Gandhi Samadhi is a memorial to Mahatma Gandhi. It signifies the struggles that Mahatma Gandhi took over for the independence of India from British Rule.

Kothi Khas Bagh

Kothi Khas Bagh is a palace located at Rampur, about 30 km east of Moradabad in Uttar Pradesh. It was the erstwhile residence of the Nawabs of Rampur. Set in a 300-acre compound, this huge 200-room European style palace is a unique blend of Islamic architecture and British architecture. It also features personal apartments and offices, music rooms and personal cinema hall of Nawabs. The huge halls, adorned with Burma teak and Belgium glass chandeliers, present a fine specimen of the architecture of a bygone era. There is an Italian marble staircase towards the main bedrooms. The statue of Kalb Ali Khan, the second Nawab of Rampur, is an eye-catching one. Kothi Khas Bagh is now in a dilapidated state due to the age and neglect.

Ambedkar Park

Ambedkar Park is a memorial to Bhimrao Ambedkar. It is a park with a railway line along its boundary.

Education 

The education sector in Rampur and its villages is developing with investments pouring in. The city has several secondary and higher secondary schools and colleges. The educational institutions are the main attraction for students of nearby places like Kashipur-Anga, Kemri, Bilaspur etc. as many new institutions have come up in the city for various higher education mainly affiliated with MJP Rohilkhand University, Bareilly. Although the city has many educational institutes, Rampur has an average literacy rate of 53.34%, lower than the national average of 59.5%. Male literacy is 61.40%, and female literacy is 44.44%. The Muhammad Ali Jauhar University is the first university to be established. Many public and government Primary schools are also playing crucial role in education sector in rural areas of Rampur. Impact College of Science & Technology is a newly opened Degree College.

 
Education in Rampur

Delhi Public School. CBSE Board 
Doon Public School CBSE Board
Lucknow Public School.ICSE Board 
 
Divine International School.ICSE Board 
Hassanson's International School. ICSE Board 
Dashmesh Academy. CBSE Board
Rampur Public School.CBSE Board 
Dayavati Modi Academy.CBSE Board 
Saint Marry School. CBSE Board 
Government Polytechnic
Jaya Prada Nursing Institute
Tondon Institute of Peramedics
Hassanson's Institute of Peramedics & Nursing
Johar Institute of Medical science
Hassanson's School of Medicine
Rajshree Medical College

Economy

Industry and agriculture 
Rampur has a largely agriculture-based economy. It has very fertile land, but little industry, and virtually no mineral extraction. The main industries of Rampur are wine-making, sugar processing, textile weaving, and the manufacture of agricultural implements. An inoperative sugar mill still stands in Rampur; it was closed down in 1999 amidst political rivalry, but work has since begun on restarting the mill after state government approval. The major cash crop of the city is mentha, and menthol oil manufacturing also flourishes there.

The company formerly known as Rampur Distillery & Chemical Company Ltd., Radico Khaitan, was established in Rampur in 1943 and is India's second largest liquor manufacturer. The distillery at Rampur manufactures high grade Extra Neutral Spirits (ENA) from molasses and grain, with a production capacity of 75 million litres of molasses ENA, 30 million of grain neutral spirits, and 460 thousands litres of malt whisky annually.

The kite-making industry is one of the oldest and prime industries in Rampur, with various sizes and shapes of kite created by hand to this day. The kites made in Rampur are in great demand all over Uttar Pradesh.

Beedi making is another booming industry in Rampur. As noted above, Rampur-manufactured knives were quite famous in the 20th century and were known as Rampuri Chaaku. Eventually, however, the Government of Uttar Pradesh banned making knives with blades longer than 4.5 inches, leading to a drop in their popularity.

Other establishments

Mentha and allied products Mursaina Rampur
The major crops grown here include maize, sugarcane and rice. Majority of the crops are used as food by the people who grow them, therefore these crops do not go market.

 Economic development indicators

Communication and media

Communication networks 
All prominent tele-communication network provider in India offer their services in Rampur.

Radio services 
Radio services available in Rampur. Rampur Radio.& Door Dharshan Rampur

Print media 
The Hindi daily news papers include Amrit Vichar,Dainik Jagran, Amar Ujala and The Hindustan. Prominent English dailies like The Times of India, The Hindustan Times, The Young Turk and Indian Express have fewer readers. The local Urdu newspaper is Rampur ka elaan. It is published from Rampur since 1991.

Notable people

 Abul Kalam Azad first education minister, Republic of India and President of India.
 Athar Shah Khan Jaidi, Pakistani comedian, writer was born in Rampur
 Azam Khan, Indian politician of Samajwadi Party
 Baba Rampuri, American emigrant to India, a Naga Sadhu and ascetic
 Baldev Singh Aulakh Indian politician and minister in Uttar Pradesh government 
 Javed Siddiqui
 Mohammad Ali, Pakistani actor
 Mohammad Ali Jauhar Journalist, scholar, political activist, poet
 Mukhtar Abbas Naqvi, Indian politician and cabinet ministers in Modi Government 
 Obaidullah Baig, Pakistani scholar, Urdu writer/novelist, columnist, media expert and documentary filmmaker
 Pran, Bollywood actor, was brought up here
 Raza Murad, Bollywood actor, was born and brought up in Rampur.
 Rukhsar Rehman, Indian film & television actress and model in Bollywood
 Shama Zaidi, screenwriter, theatre actress, documentary filmmaker, costume designer, art director and journalist
 Zulfikar Ali Khan, Nawab of Rampur and member of parliament

References

Bibliography 
 Syed Asghar Ali Shadami, Ahwalay Riyasatay Rampur (Tarikhi wa Maashrati Pusmanzar), ed. Rizwanullah Khan Enayati
 Tanzim Ahbab Rampur Karachi Nagin Chowrangee, a great masterpiece from Tanzeem

External links 

 
 Genealogy of Rampur (Princely State)
The Rampur Raza Library: Official Website
B. N. Goswamy, "A great collection in a small place", The Tribune (July 16, 2006)

 
Rohilkhand
Rohilla
Cities in Uttar Pradesh